Euchromius mouchai is a species of moth in the family Crambidae described by Stanisław Błeszyński in 1961. It is found on Corsica and Sicily and in Russia and Turkey.

References

Moths described in 1961
Crambinae
Moths of Europe
Moths of Asia